Renn McDonnell Hawkey (born March 29, 1974) is an American musician, songwriter, film producer, and occasional actor. He played the synthesizer for the metal band Deadsy, performing on their self-titled debut album (1996) and subsequent releases Commencement (2002) and Phantasmagore (2006).

In 2011, Hawkey served as musical director and producer on his wife Vera Farmiga's directorial debut film Higher Ground, and in 2017, he executive produced the documentary film Unspoken. In 2015, he had a recurring role as Paul Koretsky in the A&E series The Returned.

Early life
Hawkey was born in New York City, and grew up in Ossining, New York. He is the third of five children born to Penelope "Penny" (née Sharp), an advertising executive who wrote the Coca-Cola commercial "Hey Kid, Catch!", and William Stevenson "Bill" Hawkey, who also worked in advertising. His parents now own and operate Sundial Farm, a plant nursery in Ossining. Hawkey has four full siblings: Adam, a film compositor and colorist, Robin, a chiropractor, Timothy, a marketing managing director, and Molly, an actress and comedian. He also has two paternal half-siblings from his father's first marriage: William, a headmaster of The Pennington School, and Elisabeth, a corporate chef.

Hawkey attended the Hyde School in Maine, where he met future bandmate Elijah Blue Allman, and subsequently spent a semester studying at Sarah Lawrence College. During his childhood, he played the piano and cello.

Career

Music
Hawkey was the third member to join Deadsy after frontman Elijah Blue Allman sent him a Juno-106 synth and a demo tape made by Allman and drummer Alec Puro. Each member of the band represented a color and "entity", with Hawkey's being yellow and science and medicine, respectively. The members also had their own unique appearance; Hawkey would dress in medical scrubs. On August 1, 1996, Deadsy released their self-titled debut album on the music label Sire Records. In 1999, Deadsy received attention from labels and notable musicians, with their first gig at The Viper Room attracting members of Limp Bizkit, Orgy, Sugar Ray, and Thirty Seconds to Mars.

The band's second studio album, Commencement, was released on May 14, 2002, and was their debut record released on a major music label after signing to Jonathan Davis' Elementree Records, a division of DreamWorks Records. In addition to playing the synthesizer on Commencement, Hawkey also programmed and played guitar on a number of the tracks. The band subsequently released their first music video, for the song "The Key to Gramercy Park", with Davis providing guest vocals on the track and Fred Durst directing. That same year, Deadsy was invited by Korn to join the Family Values Tour, along with Puddle of Mudd, Stone Temple Pilots, and Linkin Park.

In 2002, Hawkey also worked with Thirty Seconds to Mars on their self-titled debut album, playing the synthesizer on the song "Capricorn (A Brand New Name)". Deadsy left DreamWorks in 2004, citing its sale to Interscope Records as one of the reasons. In 2006, Deadsy was asked to again join Korn and co-headliners Deftones on the Family Values Tour 2006. The band released their third studio album, Phantasmagore, on August 22, 2006, through Immortal Records. This album would ultimately mark Hawkey's final appearance as part of Deadsy. The band went on hiatus in April 2007, after which Hawkey began a career in carpentry. In 2011, Hawkey served as the music director to his wife's directorial debut Higher Ground.

In November 2018, Deadsy reformed and played a show at the San Quentin State Prison alongside Queens of the Stone Age. They are expected to release their fourth studio album in 2019.

Film
Prior to being a film producer, Hawkey had a cameo role as a musician in the musical comedy film The Singing Detective (2003). As a film producer, Hawkey has worked on the drama film Higher Ground (2011), directed by his wife Vera Farmiga, in which he was also an uncredited and unnamed extra. In 2015, he appeared in the first, seventh, and eighth episodes of the Carlton Cuse-produced A&E supernatural drama series The Returned in the supporting role of Paul Koretsky, a father grieving the death of his son in a fatal bus crash. He served as an executive producer on the documentary film Unspoken (2017).

Personal life
In 2004, Hawkey began dating actress Vera Farmiga after being introduced by mutual friend Allen Hughes on the set of Touching Evil. The couple married in a private ceremony on September 13, 2008, when Farmiga was five months pregnant with their first child. Their son, Fynn McDonnell Hawkey, was born on January 13, 2009, in Rhinebeck, New York. It was announced in April 2010 that Hawkey and Farmiga were expecting their second child. Farmiga gave birth to a daughter, Gytta Lubov Hawkey, on November 4, 2010. The family splits their time between homes in New York City and Vancouver.

Discography

 Deadsy (1996)
 Commencement (2002)
 Phantasmagore (2006)

Filmography

References

External links
 

1974 births
American carpenters
American expatriates in Canada
Film producers from New York (state)
American male guitarists
American male songwriters
American male television actors
American heavy metal keyboardists
American rock keyboardists
Deadsy members
Guitarists from New York (state)
Living people
Male actors from New York (state)
People from Ossining, New York
Sarah Lawrence College alumni
Songwriters from New York (state)
21st-century American guitarists
21st-century American keyboardists
21st-century American male musicians
20th-century American keyboardists
20th-century American male musicians